Walker Celtic Football Club was a semi-professional association football club based in Walker, Newcastle upon Tyne, England. They were founded in 1926 and joined the North Eastern League Second Division. In 1939, after nine consecutive seasons in the First Division, the club folded. In the 1937–38 season, the team reached the First Round Proper of the FA Cup for the only time. They held Bradford City to a 1–1 draw at home, before losing 11–3 in the replay at Valley Parade.

Honours
 North Eastern League Second Division: 1929–30
Cheese cup 1928-29

Former players
1. Players that have played/managed in the Football League or any foreign equivalent to this level (i.e. fully professional league).
2. Players with full international caps.
3. Players that hold a club record or have captained the club.
 Jack Allen
 James McClennon

External links
Walker Celtic at the Football Club History Database
Walker Celtic at footballdatabase.eu

Defunct football clubs in England
Defunct football clubs in Tyne and Wear
Association football clubs established in 1926
Association football clubs disestablished in 1939
1926 establishments in England
1939 disestablishments in England
North Eastern League